Artesia Station is an at-grade light rail station on the A Line of the Los Angeles Metro Rail system. The station is located alongside the Union Pacific freight railroad's Wilmington Subdivision (the historic route of the Pacific Electric Railway), at its intersection with Artesia Boulevard, after which the station is named, in the city of Compton, California.

Artesia is a park and ride station with 380 parking spaces. The station is near the southern border of Compton, California near the unincorporated community of Rancho Dominguez. It is on Artesia Boulevard near the intersection of Alameda Street. It is also close to the Artesia Freeway (SR 91).

On June 7, 2012, editorial in the Los Angeles Times described the station as,"extremely unfriendly to pedestrians" and,"a Third World train station."

Service

Station layout

Hours and frequency

Connections 
, the following connections are available:
Compton Renaissance Transit: 5
Torrance Transit: 6, 13

Notable places nearby 
The station is within walking distance of the following notable places:
Compton College
Crystal Casino
Dominguez Rancho Adobe
Major League Baseball Urban Youth Academy

References

External links 
 Metro website

A Line (Los Angeles Metro) stations
Railway stations in the United States opened in 1990
Compton, California
1990 establishments in California
Pacific Electric stations